

British Empire
Berbice – Henry William Bentinck, Lieutenant Governor of Berbice (1814–1820)
India – Francis Rawdon-Hastings, 1st Marquess of Hastings, Governor-General of India (1813–1823)
Ionian Islands – Thomas Maitland, Lord High Commissioner (1816–1823)
Ireland – Charles Chetwynd-Talbot, 2nd Earl Talbot, Lord Lieutenant of Ireland (1817–1821)
Malta – Thomas Maitland, Governor of Malta (1813–1824)
New South Wales – Major-General Lachlan Macquarie, Governor (1810–1821)

Portugal
Angola – Manuel Vieira Tovar de Albuquerque, Governor of Angola (1819–1821)

Spanish Empire
Viceroyalty of New Granada – Juan de la Cruz Mourgeón y Achet, nominal (1819–1821)
Viceroyalty of New Spain – Juan Ruíz de Apodaca, conde de Venadito (1816–1821)
Captaincy General of Cuba – Juan Manuel Cajigal y Niño, Governor of Cuba (1819–1821)
Spanish East Indies – Mariano Fernández de Folgueras, Governor-General of the Philippines (1816–1822)
Viceroyalty of Peru – Joaquín de la Pezuela y Sánchez, marqués de Viluma, Viceroy of Peru (1816–1821)

Colonial governors
Colonial governors
1820